Tae-suk, also spelled Tae-seok or Tae-sok, is a Korean masculine given name. Its meaning depends on the hanja used to write each syllable of the name. There are 20 hanja with the reading "tae" and 20 hanja with the reading "suk" on the South Korean government's official list of hanja which may be registered for use in given names.

People with this name include:
Oh Taeseok (born 1940), South Korean filmmaker
Kim Tae-seok (born 1946), South Korean sport shooter
Chang Tae-suk (born 1968), South Korean fencer
Ronald Tae-Sok Kim (born 1979), South Korean-born American politician
Lee Tae-seok (born 1962), South Korean Catholic priest and doctor who helped the people of Tonj, Sudan

Fictional characters with this name include:
Han Tae-seok, in 2000 South Korean television series Autumn in My Heart
Tae-seok, in 2002 South Korean television series Age of Innocence
Jeong Tae-seok, in 2012 South Korean film Confession of Murder

See also
List of Korean given names

References

Korean masculine given names